Jennifer Gentle is an Italian psychedelic rock band.

The band's name derives from a verse of the song "Lucifer Sam" by Syd Barrett.

History
Jennifer Gentle was formed by Marco Fasolo and Alessio Gastaldello in early 2000, after the breakup of Marco’s previous band, Carcers. Later, these two young men teamed up with guitarist Isacco Maretto and bassist Nick Crivellari, which would complete the early stage of this Northern Italian rock group.
Jennifer Gentle imitated the influence of 60s psychedelic rock icon Syd Barrett (Pink Floyd), and recorded their first album I Am You Are in their own basement (Silly Boy Entertainment 2001). However, it wasn’t until their second basement-recording, Funny Creatures Lane (2002), that they began to gain attention from radio stations across the US and Britain. They began touring with Acid Mothers Temple’s Kawabata Makoto and cut a session with WFMU, releasing the tour on a live album, The Wrong Cage in 2002. When Crivellari left Jennifer Gentle, Paolo Mioni (guitar), Liviano Mos (keyboards) and Francesco Candura of  Rivulets (bass) were welcomed into the band as live stage members.
In February 2004, Jennifer Gentle became the first Italian band to be signed to Sub Pop records. They released their third studio album, Valende, which was recorded in the same basement on the outskirts of Padova, Italy, in 2004. Marco and Alessio are responsible for all instrumentation and vocals on their albums.
This Italian duo is known to have incorporated instruments such as kazoos, cow bells, toy glockenspiel, bowed guitars, old Bontempi air organs, plastic flutes, chains and clocks, and deflating balloons ("I Do Dream You", Valende).

They were the first European band to receive a contract with Sub Pop Records.

Discography
 2001: I Am You Are
 2002: Funny Creatures Lane
 2002: The Wrong Cage
 2004: Valende
 2006: A New Astronomy
 2006: Sacramento Sessions/5 of 3
 2007: The Midnight Room
 2008: Evanescent Land
 2008: Live in the House of God 
 2010: Concentric
 2019: Jennifer Gentle

Appearances
Jennifer Gentle made an appearance at the May Day Music Festival at Hamilton College on April 30, 2005. Other featured artists they shared the stage with included Dead Meadow, Rainer Maria, Tim Reynolds, Virginia Coalition, and The Pharcyde.
At the South by Southwest festivals and conference in Texas, Jennifer Gentle shared the stage with fellow Sub Pop records bands, Robyn Hitchcock, The Thermals, and Sleater-Kinney (2005).

References

External links
Jennifer Gentle on My Space
South By Southwest

Jennifer Gentle Interview

Musical groups established in 2000
Italian rock music groups